Genes & Diseases is a bimonthly peer-reviewed open access medical journal covering medical genetics. It is published by Elsevier on behalf of Chongqing Medical University in alliance with the Association of Chinese Americans in Cancer Research. It was established in 2014 and the editors-in-chief are Tong-Chuan He (University of Chicago Medical Center) and Ailong Huang (Chongqing Medical University).

Abstracting and indexing
The journal is abstracted and indexed in:
Biological Abstracts
BIOSIS Previews
Current Contents/Life Sciences
Embase
Science Citation Index Expanded
Scopus
According to the Journal Citation Reports, the journal has a 2020 impact factor of 7.103.

References

External links

Medical genetics journals
Bimonthly journals
Elsevier academic journals
Chongqing Medical University
Publications established in 2020
English-language journals